Fort William Stadium is a soccer, football, and track and field stadium in Thunder Bay, Ontario and is part of the Royal Canadian Legion Sports Complex. It has a seating capacity of 3,500.   Many upgrades have been made to the complex, including scoreboard, lights and field size.

References

Soccer venues in Ontario
Sports venues in Thunder Bay